The Manitoba Federation of Labour is the Manitoba provincial trade union federation of the Canadian Labour Congress.

It was formed in 1956 and has a membership of 125,000 people working in various private sector and public sector fields such as Manufacturing, Government, Retail, Hospitals, Schools, Natural Resources, Tourism, Agriculture, and Transportation.

External links
www.mfl.mb.ca
Manitoba Federation of Labour (I) – Canadian Labour Unions – Web Archive created by the University of Toronto Libraries
Manitoba Federation of Labour (II) – Canadian Labour Unions – Web Archive created by the University of Toronto Libraries

Canadian Labour Congress
Provincial federations of labour (Canada)

Trade unions established in 1956
1956 establishments in Manitoba